Shubnoye is a rural locality (a selo) and the administrative center of Shubinskoye Rural Settlement, Ostrogozhsky District, Voronezh Oblast, Russia. The population was 1,061 as of 2010. There are 15 streets.

Geography 
Shubnoye is located 17 km west of Ostrogozhsk (the district's administrative centre) by road. Gubarevka is the nearest rural locality.

References 

Rural localities in Ostrogozhsky District